Jimmy Buffett's Margaritaville is the name of a United States–based hospitality company that manages and franchises a casual dining American restaurant chain, a chain of stores selling Jimmy Buffett–themed merchandise, and casinos with lodging facilities.

The brand is named after Buffett's hit song "Margaritaville" and is owned by Margaritaville Holdings LLC (a subsidiary of Cheeseburger Holding Company, LLC).  There are locations in the United States, Canada, and Mexico, six island locations throughout the Caribbean as well as in Sydney, Australia, since September 2012.

Some locations are franchise-owned, such as the Caribbean, Australian, and Mexican locations. In 2014, a Brazilian company bought 12 Margaritaville restaurants and the rights to expand the company in the U.S.

History 

In 1985, Buffett opened his first successful "Margaritaville" retail store in Key West, Florida, following a failed Margaritaville in Gulf Shores, Alabama. In 2002, he expanded his business ventures by partnering with Outback Steakhouse to develop the first Cheeseburger in Paradise Restaurant in Southport, Indiana.

In late 2006, Jimmy Buffett announced on the website that the Margaritaville Cafes will no longer purchase or serve Canadian seafood products.

On May 15, 2007, Harrah's Entertainment, now Caesars Entertainment Corp. announced plans to build the $700 million Margaritaville Casino Resort in Biloxi, Mississippi on the site of the former Grand Casino Biloxi and Casino Magic Biloxi properties. Due to the U.S. recession, however, construction of the casino ceased on June 10, 2008.

On January 12, 2011, following the announcement of the new partnership between MVB Holdings and the Brosig, Sekul and Sims families, for the differently planned Biloxi, Mississippi, casino, John Payne, Caesars Entertainment Corp. central division president, stated, "We are disappointed that our project with Margaritaville will not proceed."  This casino eventually opened, then closed a few years later.  Recently, a Margaritaville resort opened on Highway 90 at the location of the old Grand Casino.  This new resort does not have a casino.

Jimmy Buffett's Margaritaville is featured in the 2015 film Jurassic World as one of the restaurants in the fictional theme park, with Buffett himself making a cameo appearance as one of the guests running away from the Pteranodon attack.

Locations

Margaritaville

 Atlantic City, New Jersey 
 Biloxi, Mississippi
 Bloomington, Minnesota (inside Mall of America)
 Boston, Massachusetts (Opening Summer 2022)
 Capitola, California
 Chicago, Illinois (Part of Navy Pier)
 Cleveland, Ohio
 Cozumel, Mexico          
 Destin, Florida
 Falmouth, Jamaica
 Grand Cayman, Cayman Islands
 Grand Turk, Turks and Caicos Islands
 Hollywood, California (part of Universal CityWalk Hollywood)
 Hollywood, Florida
 Key West, Florida
 Las Vegas, Nevada (part of Flamingo Las Vegas)
 Montego Bay, Jamaica
 Myrtle Beach, South Carolina
 Nashville, Tennessee
 Negril, Jamaica
 New York, New York (Times Square)
 Niagara Falls Ontario
 Ocho Rios, Jamaica
 Orlando, Florida (part of Universal CityWalk Orlando)
 Osage Beach, Missouri 
 Palm Springs, California
 Panama City Beach, Florida
 Paradise Island, Bahamas
 Pigeon Forge, Tennessee
 San Antonio, Texas                
 Syracuse, New York
 Tulsa, Oklahoma

Landshark Bar & Grill

 Atlantic City, New Jersey
 Biloxi, Mississippi
 Branson, Missouri
 Buford, Georgia
 Conroe, Texas
 Daytona Beach, Florida
 Gatlinburg, Tennessee
 Harvest Caye, Belize
 Hollywood, Florida
 Myrtle Beach, South Carolina
 New York, New York (Times Square)
 North Myrtle Beach, South Carolina
 Tulsa, Oklahoma
 San Antonio, Texas
 Vicksburg, Mississippi
 Pensacola Beach, Florida
 Pereybere, Mauritius
 Osage Beach, Missouri

Air Margaritaville
Airport Lounge Restaurants
 Detroit Metropolitan Airport
 Fernando Luis Ribas Dominicci Airport
 Cancún International Airport
 São Paulo/Guarulhos International Airport
 Miami International Airport
 Tocumen International Airport
 Sangster International Airport
 Fort Lauderdale–Hollywood International Airport

Retail outlets
As of February 2020, United States retail store locations are in Key West; New Orleans; Orlando; Las Vegas; Myrtle Beach; Glendale (state not listed); Panama City Beach, Florida; Mohegan Sun; Honolulu; Pensacola Beach; Nashville; and Chicago. The newest concept, a "Landshark Surfshack Retail Shop" opened May 17, 2011 at the Myrtle Beach SkyWheel attraction. Mexico's retail locations are in Cancun and Cozumel. Canada's retail location is in Niagara Falls, Ontario. Caribbean retail locations in the British West Indies are in Montego Bay (including two "Air Margaritaville" locations at Sangster International Airport), Negril and Ocho Rios on the island of Jamaica; Grand Turk in the Turks and Caicos Islands; and George Town, Grand Cayman in the Cayman Islands.

Vacation Clubs
Nested in the Caribbean, specifically St. Thomas, Virgin Islands, and Rio Grande, Puerto Rico, are vacation clubs operated by Margaritaville.

Hotels 

On June 28, 2010, the Margaritaville Beach Hotel (pictured to the right) opened on Pensacola Beach. The former site of a Holiday Inn, destroyed by Hurricane Ivan on September 16, 2004, Margaritaville Hotel sits on over 800 feet of gulf-front property. An additional 800 feet overlooks the bay. The beachfront hotel features 'barefoot elegance' with 162 guest rooms, including 24 Corner King Executive rooms with wrap-around balconies.

Future phased-plans include an adjacent free-standing Margaritaville Cafe restaurant and a bayside waterpark.

Plans for a second and third Margaritaville Beach Hotel were announced in 2010. The second, still in the planning stages, would be located in Myrtle Beach.

The 349-room Margaritaville Hollywood Beach Resort opened in 2015 in Hollywood, Florida.

The Margaritaville Island Hotel opened in Pigeon Forge, Tennessee in 2015 followed by Margaritaville Island Inn in 2017. The Margaritaville Resort opened in Gatlinburg, Tennessee in 2018.

Margaritaville Lake of the Ozarks  opened in the Spring of 2019 and offers a wide variety of bars, restaurants, water activities, golf, etc.- all right on the Lake.  Has large outdoor pool, tiki bar, marina as well as indoor waterpark and even horseback riding.

In late 2020, the first Margaritaville Resort on the West Coast opened in Palm Springs, California.

In spring 2021, Margaritaville Resort Time Square, New York opened. The resort is the northernmost resort in the chain,  and it opened alongside 5 restaurants. It feature a Tropical NYC atmosphere and a 50-foot replica of the Statue of Liberty holding a Margarita. The resort also feature New York's only year-round outdoor pool on one of its decks.

Casinos 

The Las Vegas Margaritaville at the Flamingo has expanded to include its very own 15,000-square-foot Margaritaville-branded casino. The casino was scheduled to open October 1, 2011.

On January 12, 2011, it was announced that Buffett's MVB Holdings company is working with Coast casino veteran Tom Brosig and other investors to build the casual three-story, 68,000-square-foot, $48 million  "Jimmy Buffett's Margaritaville Casino and Restaurant" resort on the back bay at the old East Harrison County Industrial Park on 5th Street in Biloxi. The developers will build the casino resort in phases, starting with a small casino, a restaurant, events center and marina.

Developers said it should open in April or May 2012.

On June 22, 2011, Paradise Casino LLC unveiled plans for the Margaritaville Resort Casino to be built in Bossier City, Louisiana. The complex, a $170 million, 400-room resort, would include an 18-story hotel tower, 1,000-seat entertainment complex with a VIP balcony and an outdoor tropical area visible to the north from the Louisiana Boardwalk.

In March 2013, the Muscogee (Creek) Nation announced that its River Spirit Casino on the Arkansas River in Tulsa would become a Margaritaville Casino as part of a $250 million project that would also add a 22-story, 500-room luxury tower to the existing facility.

Latitude Margaritaville Daytona Beach
Latitude Margaritaville is a $1 billion retirement village in Daytona Beach, Florida. The project is a joint venture between Minto Communities and Buffett's Margaritaville Holdings, with the development being built on land close to LPGA Boulevard and about a mile to the west from Interstate-95.

Phase one of the community will have 400 homes with a potential of 6,900 homes, once the project is completed. As of March 2018, 250 lots have been sold with prices between the low $200,000s to the mid $300,000s. The community will have a pet salon, grocery store, and a private beach when it opens in April 2018.

Since opening in Daytona, two other locations have been announced; Latitude Margaritaville Hilton Head, South Carolina and Latitude Margaritaville Watersound, Florida.  Hilton Head offers a wide range of home designs and floor plans. Amenities will include a resort-style pool, fitness center, social hall, game and hobby rooms, arts and learning programs, indoor and outdoor dining with signature Margaritaville food and beverage concepts, tennis and pickleball courts, and a 290,000-square-foot Margaritaville retail center.  Phase one is currently underway with 203 home sites. Current plans call for 3,000+ homes once the community is complete.

Latitude Margaritaville Watersound will break ground in late 2019 and will be the third of the communities to be developed.

Cruises 
On December 8, it was announced that a partnership was reached with Bahamas Paradise Cruise Line and Margaritaville. The cruise line will be rebranded as Margaritaville at Sea. The line's sole ship the Grand Classica will be renamed the Margaritaville Paradise following a multimillion dollar refit in April 2022. The refit will change the ship's interiors and venues to match the Margaritaville brand and décor. It is set to begin sailing starting April 30. It will operate 2 day cruises from the Port of Palm Beach to Freeport, Bahamas.

See also
 Cheeseburger in Paradise (restaurant)
 Margaritaville
 Margaritaville (South Park)

References

External links 

 Jimmy Buffett's Margaritaville Cafes

Restaurant chains in the United States
American companies established in 1985
1985 establishments in Florida
Jimmy Buffett
Companies based in Orlando, Florida
Hotel chains in the United States
Gambling companies of the United States
Franchises